A number of armed groups have involved themselves in the Syrian Civil War spillover in Lebanon.

Syrian Civil War spillover in Lebanon (17 June 2011 – 28 August 2017)

Notes
 The al-Nusra Front closely cooperated with ISIL between 2013 and 2014, were considered "frenemies" in 2015, and became embroiled in open conflict with it in 2017.

See also
List of armed groups in the Syrian Civil War
List of armed groups in the Iraqi Civil War
List of armed groups in the Libyan Civil War
List of armed groups in the Yemeni Civil War
Combatants of the Iraq War

References

Lebanon-related lists
Syrian civil war spillover in Lebanon
Spillover of the Syrian civil war
Military history of Lebanon
Lebanon